BN Camelopardalis is a suspected astrometric binary in the northern circumpolar constellation of Camelopardalis. It appears as a variable star that is visible to the naked eye as a dim, white-hued point of light with an apparent visual magnitude that fluctuates around 5.49. The system is located at a distance of around 310 light years from the Sun based on parallax, and is drifting further away with a radial velocity of +9 km/s.

The visible component is a weakly magnetic chemically peculiar star with a stellar classification of B9.5VpSi, matching a B-type main-sequence star with an anomalous abundance of silicon. It is a variable star that ranges in brightness from 5.34 down to 5.58. Samus et al. (2017) have it categorized as an α2 Canum Venaticorum variable with a period of 2.7347 days, while Adelman and Sutton (2007) found a period of 2.73501 days. The star has three times the mass and radius of the Sun and is radiating 110 times the Sun's luminosity from its photosphere at an effective temperature of 11,561 K.

References

B-type main-sequence stars
Ap stars
Alpha2 Canum Venaticorum variables

Camelopardalis (constellation)
Durchmusterung objects
032650
024254
1643
Camelopardalis, BN